See You Next Wednesday is the third studio album by Palestinian-Canadian rapper Belly. It was released on 27 August 2021 by Roc Nation and XO. The album features guest appearances from the Weeknd, Young Thug, Moneybagg Yo, Gunna, PnB Rock, Nas, Nav, Lil Uzi Vert, Big Sean, and Benny the Butcher.

Background 
On 7 April 2020, Belly took to social media, where he revealed that for years he has been going to therapy for depression and PTSD. He also revealed that he regained the weight he had previously lost, and that he was on anti-depressants. He then hinted that new music was coming soon, by stating: "This shit is all I got, if anything can bring be back from the ashes; it's music, my family & my fans. I don't need sympathy or pity from anyone, I'm only saying this to let y'all know: I won't lay down and die... see you next wednesday".

In January 2021, Belly revealed that he received the "seal of approval" from Jay-Z and the Weeknd, and that his album, now titled See You Next Wednesday, is complete. Belly would later state in an interview that the album's title pays homage to film director John Landis and his well known running gag of the same name. On 17 August, Belly revealed the album's release date and tracklist.

Release and promotion

Singles 
The first single off the album, "Money on the Table" featuring Benny the Butcher, was released on Belly's 37th birthday, 7 April 2021. The music video was released on 14 April. The second single, "Zero Love" featuring Moneybagg Yo, was released on June 3. The music video was released on 9 June. The third single, "Better Believe" featuring the Weeknd and Young Thug, was released on 22 July. The music video was released on the same day. The song debuted on the US Billboard Hot 100 chart at number 88. The fourth single, "Die for It", was released along with the album and the single's music video, on 27 August 2021. It features guest vocals from the Weeknd and American rapper, Nas.

Promotional singles 
The first promotional single, "IYKYK" was released on the same day as the album's lead single, "Money on the Table", on 7 April 2021.

Track listing 

Notes
  signifies an additional producer.
 "Requiem" features background vocals from the Weeknd.

Personnel
 Fabian Marasciullo – mixing (tracks 1, 3–13, 15)
 Colin Leonard – mastering
 DannyBoyStyles – programming (tracks 1–3, 6, 7, 10, 11, 15), keyboards (tracks 1, 3, 6, 7, 10, 11, 15), mixing (track 2), recording (tracks 2, 6, 8, 11)
 The ANMLS
 Richard Muñoz – programming (tracks 1–3, 8, 10, 12, 13, 15), keyboards (tracks 1, 3, 8, 10, 12, 13, 15)
 Faris Al-Majed – recording (tracks 1–6, 8–15), programming (tracks 1–3, 8, 10, 12, 13, 15), keyboards (tracks 1, 3, 8, 10, 12, 13, 15), mixing (track 14)
 Ben Billions – programming, keyboards (track 5)
 Shin Kamiyama – recording (tracks 3, 7, 8)
 Myles Martin – programming, keyboards (track 6)
 Money Musik – programming, keyboards (track 7)
 DaHeala – programming, keyboards (track 8)
 Gabriel Zardes – recording (track 8)
 Mark Goodchild – recording (track 8)
 Nav – programming, keyboards (track 9)
 Pro Logic – recording (track 9)
 The Weeknd – programming, keyboards (track 10)
 Belly – programming, keyboards (track 11)

Charts

References 

2021 albums
Belly (rapper) albums
Roc Nation albums
Albums produced by Zaytoven
Albums produced by Nav (rapper)
Albums produced by the Weeknd